The Order of Muhammad, also referred to as Order of Sovereignty (French: Ordre de la Souveraineté or Ordre de Mohammed), is the highest state decoration of the Kingdom of Morocco. The Order was instituted on 16 November 1956 by King Mohammed V of Morocco, who reigned between 1927 and 1961.

Classes
The Order of Muhammad is issued in three classes, one special and two ordinary:
Special Class: who wears a diamonds and with rubies decorated collar around the neck. The chain has nineteen golden links in the form of stylized flowers in filigree gold and comes together in a large enamelled coat of arms in European style. A badge is suspended to this coat of arms and has the shape of a gold star with ten points. A part of the surface is green enamelled. The central disk of the badge shows the Moroccan coat of arms. Only the badge of the Special Class and the first class contains edged ring set with rubies and diamonds and an outer ring of 36 diamonds. The Special Class is awarded to monarchs and heads of state.

The ordinary classes:
First Class: who wears a badge in the shape of a star decorated with precious stones on the left chest.
Second Class: who wears a badge of the order in the shape of a star, but without gemstones, on the left chest.

There is no ribbon attached to the order.

Eligibility
The Order is only eligible for members of the Moroccan royal family, as well as foreign monarchs, princes and princesses, and foreign heads of state. Ordinary Moroccans can also be taken up in this order, although with great exception.

Recipients

 Akihito
 Albert II of Belgium
 Hassanal Bolkiah
 Jefri Bolkiah, Prince of Brunei
 Dwight D. Eisenhower
 Elizabeth II
 Faisal II of Iraq
 Felipe VI of Spain
 Prince Ghazi bin Muhammad
 Hamad bin Isa Al Khalifa
 Hussein of Jordan
 Idris of Libya
 Juan Carlos I of Spain
 Princess Lalla Amina of Morocco
 Queen Letizia of Spain
 Moza bint Nasser
 Mohamed bin Zayed Al Nahyan
 Prince Muhammad bin Talal
 Farah Pahlavi
 Queen Paola of Belgium
 Queen Sofía of Spain
 Hamad bin Khalifa Al Thani
Hery Rajaonarimampianina
 Donald Trump

References

External links
Décret royal n° 199-66 du 1er ramadan 1386 (14 décembre 1966) portant création des ordres du Royaume - website of the government of Morocco 

Orders, decorations, and medals of Morocco
Awards established in 1956
Muhammad, Order of
1956 establishments in Morocco